The United States Daughters of 1812, National Headquarters, also known as the Admiral John Henry Upshur House, is a Victorian Queen Anne building from 1884 which is listed on the National Register of Historic Places.  It was commissioned by near-retirement American admiral John Henry Upshur for architectural design by Frederick C. Withers and was constructed by builders Langley & Gettinger in 1884.

It was later divided into three apartments.

The United States Daughters of 1812 organization bought the building in 1928 for $31,214.44 and has used it since.  Its NRHP nomination notes some irony in the historic organization's choice of a Victorian-style residence.

References

Houses on the National Register of Historic Places in Washington, D.C.
Queen Anne architecture in Washington, D.C.
Houses completed in 1884
Women in Washington, D.C.